Stefan Fegerl (born 12 September 1988 in Gmünd) is an Austrian table tennis player. He competed at the 2016 Summer Olympics in the men's singles event, in which he was eliminated in the third round by Koki Niwa, and as part of the Austrian team in the men's team event. In 2021, he competed in the 2020 Olympics.

References

Exteranls links 

1988 births
Living people
Austrian male table tennis players
Olympic table tennis players of Austria
Table tennis players at the 2016 Summer Olympics
Table tennis players at the 2015 European Games
European Games medalists in table tennis
European Games bronze medalists for Austria
Table tennis players at the 2019 European Games
People from Gmünd, Lower Austria
Table tennis players at the 2020 Summer Olympics
Sportspeople from Lower Austria
21st-century Austrian people